Calochortus cernuus is a rare Mexican species of plants in the lily family. It is found only in the hills surrounding the community of Tepoztlán in the State of Morelos south of Mexico City, northeast of Cuernavaca.

Description
Calochortus cernuus is a bulb-forming herb up to 40 cm tall, usually unbranched. Flowers are nodding (hanging) with dark brown sepals and purple petals.

References

External links
Pacific Bulb Society, Calochortus Species Two photos of several species including Calochortus cernuus

cernuus
Flora of Morelos
Plants described in 1911